Sir John Charles Rodgers, 1st Baronet (5 October 1906 – 29 March 1993) was a British Conservative politician.

Rodgers was educated at St Peter's School, York, and in France and Oxford. He became a scholar in modern history at Oxford and subsequently joined the staff of University College, Hull. He then entered the private sector becoming deputy chairman of the advertising agency J Walter Thompson Ltd. During World War II, he worked in the Foreign Office, the Department of Overseas Trade (as director of post-war planning) and the Ministry of Production. He then worked in business, travelling widely and becoming chairman of the British Market Research Bureau. He was a member of the BBC General Advisory Council 1945–52.

Rodgers was Member of Parliament for Sevenoaks from 1950 until 1979. He served as Parliamentary Private Secretary to David Eccles from 1951 and Parliamentary Secretary to the Board of Trade 1958–60.

Arms

References

External links 
 

1906 births
1993 deaths
Conservative Party (UK) MPs for English constituencies
People educated at St Peter's School, York
Baronets in the Baronetage of the United Kingdom
UK MPs 1950–1951
UK MPs 1951–1955
UK MPs 1955–1959
UK MPs 1959–1964
UK MPs 1964–1966
UK MPs 1966–1970
UK MPs 1970–1974
UK MPs 1974
UK MPs 1974–1979
Parliamentary Secretaries to the Board of Trade
Ministers in the Macmillan and Douglas-Home governments, 1957–1964